is the fictional protagonist of the manga series D.Gray-man, which was created by Japanese artist and writer Katsura Hoshino. In the series, which is set in the 19th century, Allen is a teenager who joins the Black Order—a group of soldiers known as exorcists. Allen uses an object called Innocence to fight demons known as Akuma. Allen's Innocence initially assumes the form of a gigantic left arm and evolves to give him new abilities, which he uses to fight the Millennium Earl—who created an army of Akuma to destroy the world—and his superhuman followers the Noah Family. Allen learns he is connected to the Noah and might become one of them.

Hoshino based Allen's characterization on Robin, the shorter-haired female protagonist of the one-shot comic Zone. She designed Allen's clothing to resemble that of the nineteenth century, giving him a ribbon tie and other accessories to make him appear gentlemanly. Hoshino gave Allen a calm demeanor in contrast with her typical rambunctious, rude characters; and to make him look intimidating she gave Allen a pentagram-shaped scar. The manga was adapted for television as an anime series in which Allen was voiced by Sanae Kobayashi. The voices were recast for the 2016 anime television series D.Gray-man Hallow, in which Ayumu Murase replaced Kobayashi. In the English adaptation of the anime series, Allen was voiced by Todd Haberkorn.

Allen is popular with D.Gray-man readers; he is usually ranking in the top three in the series' popularity polls and reaction to the character in manga and anime publications and other media has been generally positive. His characterization has been praised; critics said his calm demeanor and mysterious origin are atypical of a shōnen protagonist. Some reviewers enjoyed Allen's multiple voice actors. Merchandise featuring Allen's likeness, including plush dolls, figurines, clothing and cosplay pieces, has been offered. In addition to the character's appearances in the anime series D.Gray-man and its sequel D.Gray-man Hallow, he has appeared in three light novels, two video games and several crossover fighting games.

Concept and creation

Manga creator Katsura Hoshino originally had no plans to create Allen's character in D.Gray-man; she wanted the Millennium Earl to be the story's protagonist. Hoshino found the Earl unsuitable for use as a main character in a manga magazine aimed at teenagers so she created Allen. Hoshino thought a mature design would be better; although she believed his final design looked best clothed with a Black Order uniform, she wondered whether it should be more masculine. Hoshino said she did not know how Allen originated; she likes her main characters to be rambunctious, rude idiots. She said the general idea for his design was an "energetic youth with messy fly-a-way hair", but when he was drawn with the uniform of the Black Order—the group Allen joins—she sensed a "lack of coordination". To make a bigger impact with Allen's arrival to the Black Order, Hoshino gave him the nickname "Destroyer of Time", which has no relevance to the story.

Hoshino based Allen on Robin, the protagonist of her one-shot comic Zone. Comparing the two, she called Allen a "different kind of boy". According to Hoshino's first editor, Allen was originally going to be a modified Akuma who looked like a boy. Her editor advised her to make Allen more vulnerable by depicting him crying, which led to Allen's gender being male to make a bigger impact with the readers. As the manga continued, Hoshino called him a comrade and  found a relationship between herself and the character, although Hoshino still admired the Millennium Earl. When the series started, Hoshino drew a colored image of Allen being held by a limb of an Akuma, representing both the series' calm and grotesque atmosphere the same time.

Allen was introduced as a "gentleman".  She demonstrated Allen's dark side when the character struck his master Cross Marian in anger at his inability to learn how he would become the 14th Noah descendant: Nea D. Campbell. According to Hoshino, Cross Marian was angry with Allen for the attack but enjoyed seeing this side of his student. For the arc involving the Third Exorcists, Hoshino's editors advised her to draw Allen as a fighter for the sake of the manga's characters Yu Kanda and Alma Karma, who are heavily featured in the saga. Allen's origins are not revealed in the manga but instead in the third light novel by Kaya Kizaki who felt the need to reread the original D.Gray-man manga in order to understand Allen's characterization. Hoshino found difficulties in writing the origins of Allen and Mana despite the simplicity it might come. Kizaki provided Hoshino's aid in the making which greatly helped the manga author to appreciate their backstory.

Design

Hoshino parted his hair in the center to emphasize his facial expressions. Because he is an exorcist, she wanted him to have a "very scary-looking image" and added the scar on his left forehead; the scar changed shape several times before becoming a pentagram. Since Hoshino wanted the Order and its enemies to have visual contrast, she gave Allen and the Exorcists black cloaks to convey a "gloomy" impression. Allen's clothing is drawn from Hoshino's general impression of the late 19th century; his ribbon tie and other accessories are intended to project a "gentlemanly image". While Allen became a darker character, Hoshino also wanted to symbolize his own fear in the way his persona became afraid his late guardian Mana Walker did not love him. As a result, Hoshino made a minor design change and rearranged the scar Mana's Akuma placed on his forehead in a berserker state; by having the scar show more clearly, Allen's disturbance about his love for Mana was more clearly expressed.

According to Hoshino, later in the series Allen's hairstyle becomes similar to that of a Super Saiyan—a transformation in the Dragon Ball series in which the character's hair becomes spiky. Hoshino said that early in D.Gray-mans publication, Allen was one of the most difficult characters to draw. By the tenth volume, she said the character was more difficult to draw than Yu Kanda. In the manga's first chapters, Allen's eyes have had different colors—red and light blue—due to a discussion between Hoshino and her editor; it was later decided to give him silver eyes. The series' title D.Gray-man is intended to have several meanings, most referring to the state of Allen and the other main characters.

During a story arc in which Allen tries to save a former Exorcist named Suman Dark, Allen's own Innocence—his deformed arm "Cross"— is destroyed in a confrontation. Because Allen trains in a sub-branch of the Black Order to regain his Innocence, Hoshino wanted to show Allen's real powers. Hoshino said she experienced a lack of inspiration in what it would be its true form to the point of feeling Allen's frustration at not being able to fight again. Eventually, Hoshino was inspired to draw Allen's real Innocence—the Crowned Clown—which is based on the Italian Pierrot. She was satisfied with Allen's dialogue that he would fight for both humans and Akumas, symbolized by his two hands, and drew this scene carefully. By the series' beginning, Hoshino intended Allen's weaponry to evolve because she started feeling that Allen's first weapon, Cross, might be appealing to the readers. Crown Clown was created to be a more stylish and cooler weapon for Allen.

Because Allen hides his identity from the Order but still claims to be an exorcist in a later arc, Hoshino conceived a new design for him that represents his self-proclamation of being one. During these chapters, Hoshino decided to hide Allen by having him dress like clown who works in the streets. This produced worries within her editors who believed the readers might not like such design as Allen would be sent bald and with a mask. However, Hoshino relieved him when claiming that upon Allen's reveal, the character would not wear his bald and that his face without make up will be revealed in order to keep with character's visual appeal.

Allen leaves the Black Order because the previous story arc had too many characters and required too much effort. Hoshino was pleased with her portrayal of Allen's valediction to comrade Lenalee Lee because it connotes the character's maturation. She noted that Allen had grown taller; early in the series he and Lenalee are depicted at the same height. Hoshino said although Allen's departure fits the series' tragic theme, he would always have comrades. Allen and Kanda, despite their frequent arguments, part on good terms; Hoshino said Kanda would assist Allen in the next story. Allen's withdrawal from the Order had been planned since he encountered the enemy Road Kamelot because Allen's nature conflicts with those of the other Exorcists, who unlike him do not wish to save the Akumas.

Voice actors

In the first animated version of D.Gray-man Allen is voiced by Sanae Kobayashi, whom Hoshino praised for capturing the character. During recording of the anime, Kobayashi befriended the Earl's voice actor Junpei Takiguchi as they chatted whenever their characters were absent from a recording, much to Hoshino's surprise. Kobayashi described Allen as an appealing character who, while not looking like a fighter, Kobayashi found his characterization interesting. Kobayashi aimed to portray Allen properly as she feared, her performance might make the character act like a child. She states that despite his peaceful demeanor, Allen often shows angry mannerism when fighting, which allowed her to relate with the character. Once the series started airing, Kobayashi commented that Allen will mature across the narrative thanks to his interactions with other characters from the series.

For its anime sequel, D.Gray-man Hallow, Kobayashi was replaced with Ayumu Murase. Murase said he had positive thoughts about his work, hoping it would appeal to the audience. During recordings of Hallow, Hoshino was surprised by Murase's work, finding him suitable for Allen. Murase's switching between two personalities—Allen and the Nea D. Campbell—impressed the manga author, who thought at first Murase was using a machine to change the tone of them. Although Murase only appeared with the Millennium Earl twice in Hallow, his job left a positive impression. During a broadcast of Hallow, Hoshino made multiple illustrations of Allen interacting with the Noah clan to support the actors. Murase was moved by Hoshino's determination to develop Allen in the manga and thus felt a better impression of his character.

Allen is voiced by Todd Haberkorn for the two series' English-language dubs; according to Haberkorn, he enjoyed voicing the character, and once cosplayed as him. In 2016, Haberkorn said that if he could voice Allen again he would pierce his ears.

Characterization and themes

Hoshino created the teenage Allen with the idea of being gentleman. Despite his friendly demeanor, Allen is obsessed with the idea of exorcising demons to the point he does not care for his own wellbeing, often clashing with the Black Order mates in the process. When Allen's Innocence is destroyed in combat, Allen expresses disgust at his own weakness, believing that he only was born to be exorcist. During a clash with another Akuma, Allen realizes that while he cares for the demons' fate, he fell love towards the Black Order. This new passion gives Allen a new strength. As time passes, his characterization changes to the point that Hoshino wrote an interview between the character and herself. In the interview she complained to Allen about his change from "pure and innocent" to a "corrupted" character, calling him "Dark Allen". "Allen" replied that the change must be due to the series' dark setting. His true innocence is claimed to be symbolic of his selfish way acting as a pacifist while fighting. Rather than killing Noah's descendants, he instead wishes to remove their dark personas Allen shows a more aggressive side of his persona when Cross Marian reveals to him he will become the 14th Noah. Because Allen was taught by his adoptive father, Mana, to walk his own path, in his own, Allen finds himself confused and hits his master. Cross Marian notes that Allen is acting like his former self, claiming that his formal mannerism was a result of trying to deal with Mana's death.

While creating the character, Hoshino was afraid readers might dislike Allen because she wrote him as a hypocrite; even though Allen is a human, he has sympathy for his enemies, the souls trapped inside the Akumas and the Noah clan. Hoshino did not like Allen because of his negative actions despite his caring words. She also wondered whether readers would care for a protagonist who is friendly with both his friends and his enemies. Despite her worries, Hoshino's editor said it would be positive if Allen remained as a hypocrite until the ending. Despite difficulties in writing him, Hoshino liked the challenge of writing Allen, expecting that future manga protagonists also provide authors with this problem.

When Allen left the Order, Hoshino said the character had become difficult to write. Allen is a philanthropist; Hoshino said she was not equally kind. Because Jump Square—the manga's host magazine at the time— was aimed at a young male audience, Hoshino said she wanted to characterize Allen as a cheerful person rather than a troubled teenager. She found this depiction difficult because his life became more complicated as the series progressed. Hoshino tries to balance Allen between "strength and sorrow", and has required occasional hiatuses. She said the most challenging part of Allen's face to draw is his smile; he often smiles, sometimes when he is lying or unhappy. After Allen left the Order, Hoshino told readers his life might be arduous and that he would cheat at gambling, which learns while training with Cross Marian. As the plot progressed, Hoshino still found difficulties in writing him because he is suffering while remaining cheerful. Chapter 222 proved more challenging for Hoshino because Allen's life was becoming difficult. During these moments, Allen's mind starts being erased from his body because he is being possessed by the Noah Nea D. Campbell. In an inner world, Allen feels he wishes to be erased and freed of pain while interacting with an illusion of Cross Marian. He remembers his beliefs and smiles at Cross' illusion despite crying at the same time.

Similar to other characters, Allen's beliefs and appearance suggest Christianity. While his first weaponry is simply named "Cross", Allen's clothing from the Black Order include Rose Cross, which symbolizes the teachings of a western esoteric tradition formed within the Christian tenets, albeit a Christianity not yet conspicuously in evidence. Hoshino's illustration involving Allen often have threads related covered with threads as she aims to show the fact that he is not only related to the fact that he is always associated with God as well as the fact that he is bound to exorcise Akumas. However, when the Crowned Clown appears as Allen's new weaponry, the Earl compares him to White Clown that is meant to chase Auguste Clown, two clown archetypes common in plays with the Allen being the former acting as the straight to the Earl's comedy one. Both Cross Marian and Bak believe that looking like a clown is a better portrayal of Allen's Innocence rather than his original arm.

Appearances

Role in D.Gray-man
Allen was born with a deformed left arm caused by the effects of a rare object known as Innocence. Abandoned by his parents, he was raised in a circus, where he meets Mana Walker. After an Akuma destroys the circus, the child adopts the name "Allen" from Mana's dog, his only friend. In the manga it is revealed that Mana died for unknown reasons years after adopting the child. Allen tries to resurrect him through a man known as the Millennium Earl. Mana is revived as an Akuma demon and cuts Allen's left eye. Allen's deformed left arm awakens, becomes an anti-Akuma weapon later called  and destroys Mana. His left eye allows him to see the souls of Akuma. Allen is estimated to be 15 years old when the series begins. Allen is often accompanied by Timcampy, a small flying golem given to him by his mentor Exorcist General Cross Marian. When Allen completes his exorcist training he is sent to Black Order headquarters. With his new colleagues, he goes on missions to recover other lost innocences. He fights the Millennium Earl, his army of Akuma and the Noah Family—a group of immortal humans who help the Earl and want to destroy the world. Allen and four other exorcists are sent to locate and protect Cross. When Allen leaves the group to save a traitor from the Black Order, a Noah (Tyki Mikk) nearly kills him. Allen stays at the Black Order's Asia Branch headquarters to recover from the experience.

During his stay at the headquarters, Allen's Innocence is restored upon the user wishing to restore his own humanity through interacting with the Black Order exorcists rather than dedicating himself to the Akumas only. He rejoins his comrades in Edo, where the group is trapped in a dimension known as the Noah's Ark. Allen and his friends fight the Noah while trying to escape. In his rematch with Tyki, Allen transforms his left arm into a sword that exorcises evil. When Cross reappears in the Ark, he makes Allen touch a piano to restore the fallen area. Returning to headquarters, Allen's loyalty is questioned and he is given an inspector, Howard Link. The Noah then send Akumas to eliminate the Order; Allen and the Generals eliminate them but are defeated by the evolved Level 4 Akuma. Allen rejoins the fight with the help of his master and Lenalee Lee; they eliminate the Akuma. Shortly afterwards, Allen learns he is the host of the late 14th Noah, Nea D. Campbell, a man who is also Mana's late brother. Before his death, Nea implanted his memories in Allen so he would be reborn. All Exorcists are ordered to kill Allen before he transforms into a Noah. Allen controls his body but he begins turning into Nea; Crowned Clown's sword hurts him, despite it only affecting Noah and Akuma.

During a fight against the Noah, Allen betrays his superiors by freeing Kanda and the Akuma of his friend Alma Karma. Link then imprisons Allen, who fears the reappearance of Nea. There, the exorcist is attacked by Apocryphos, a sentient Innocence that tries to assimilate Allen's Innocence alongside the Noah. Two Noahs and Link rescue Allen, making the Order believe he has betrayed them. Allen refuses help from the Order and the Noah, but promises Lenalee he will remain an exorcist. Allen goes into hiding and disguises himself as a clown. He is sought by his former comrades and the Noah. Allen's mind begins to leave his body due to Nea's awakening; a Cross illusion tells him to meet Katerina Eve Campbell to learn the truth behind Nea and Mana.

In other media
In addition to appearing in the manga and anime series, Allen is a playable character in two D.Gray-man video games. He is a playable or support character in the crossover fighting games Jump Super Stars, Jump Ultimate Stars and J-Stars Victory Vs, which pit Weekly Shōnen Jump characters against each other.

Allen also appears in Kaya Kizaki's D.Gray-man light novel series. In the first novel, he searches for Black Order headquarters and then disappears. He kills Akuma and learns the Order's location from a woman named Mother. In the second novel, he is a supporting character who attends the Black Order's reunion party. Allen appears briefly in the first chapter of the third novel; he greets the Black Order scientist Rohfa, who is infatuated with him. The second chapter details his childhood in a circus where he suffered abuse until he met Mana, whose late dog was Allen's first friend.

Reception

Popularity
Allen Walker is popular with D.Gray-man readers; he was the most-popular character in the series' first Shōnen Jump poll. He dropped to second place behind Yu Kanda in a second poll. The character returned to first place in the third poll and fell behind Kanda again in the fourth. Allen has also been popular outside D.Gray-man, and was the 20th-most-popular anime character in an Animedia poll. He ranked 20th in a 2007 Newtype character poll. In Newtype, Allen was nominated as the fifth-best male character of the 2016 anime season for his role in D.Gray-man Hallow. The character was voted the 17th-best male character in an Anime News Network poll, and was 46th in a 2016 Animage poll of top 100 anime characters for his role in Hallow. Anime News Network listed him as the third-best anime exorcist based on his tragic backstory and weaponry used to exorcise Akumas.

Merchandise featuring the character, including key chains, plush dolls figurines, clothing and cosplay pieces have been marketed; he has also been popular with cosplayers. New merchandise, in which Allen is often disguised as a vampire, was developed for Halloween 2016, and a piña colada drink was based on the character.

Critical response

Manga, anime, video-game and related media publications have praised and criticized the character. Multiple writers such as Sheena McNeil of the online magazine Sequential Tart enjoyed his design, finding them unique for a shōnen manga character. His redesign for Hallow received similar reactions from Amrita Aulakh of Pop Wrapped, who stated he was one of the best Shonen Jump protagonists alongside Gintoki Sakata from Gin Tama. Manga artist Osamu Akimoto told Hoshino he liked how Allen's design changed across the narrative, calling early designs as "cut" while later artwork made him look more mature. Both IGN and The Escapist felt he was a likable leading character. Active Animes Sandra Scholes found him mysterious, citing his arrival at the Black Order and the anti-Akuma weapon. Critics have noted Allen's interactions with other characters during the series such as his relationship with his partner Kanda who still work together. Manga Retcon said Allen's activities in the manga are one of the deepest parts of the 13th volume because of his interactions with his friends despite the scene's apparent simplicity.

Allen's abilities were described as "rather inspired" by Michael Aronson of Manga Life magazine. Brian Henson of Mania Beyond Entertainment wrote that Allen's mysterious, cursed eye might appeal to readers of the series. Carlo Santos of Anime News Network wrote that Allen did not use "cleverness" to defeat Akuma but let his arm "overpower the enemy". Allen was described as a "solid" hero by A.E. Sparrow of IGN. Todd Douglass Jr. of DVD Talk wrote that the character's use of the anti-Akuma weapon might seem clichéd; he found its anime depiction entertaining. In following fights, Allen's rematch with Noah Tyki Mikk was praised by Casey Brienza of Anime News Network, who also liked his new abilities, the Innocence Crown Clown and Allen's sword—which he compared with a sword in Final Fantasy VII wielded by protagonist Cloud Strife. Reviewing the same fight, Otaku USAs Joseph Luster praised Allen's development during the series and enjoyed his battle with Tyki.

Reviewers were also impressed with Allen's betrayal of the Order and his transformation into the 14th Noah; In the next volume, Chris Kirby, also of The Fandom Post, was impressed by Allen's possession by Nea. IGN was shocked by Allen's first possession by the 14th Noah, seeing in previous episodes a "beam of light in an otherwise dark series" and finding the possession "disturbing". Grant Goodman of Pop Culture Shock found the discussion as intense as a battle. Anne Lauenroth of Anime News Network noted the revelation has a powerful impact on Allen because of his future and because he starts doubting his guardian Mana ever loved him while it leaves Allen's mental state while dealing with it mysterious. Chris Beveridge of the Fandom Post enjoyed the appearance of the 14th Noah in Allen's mind, praising the character's internal conflict. According to Osborn, Allen was becoming "an increasingly more complex and interesting character" following his clashes with Nea. In the book Representing Multiculturalism in Comics and Graphic Novels, Jacob Birken wrote that Allen's use of his powers illustrates the series' theme of identity; although Allen seems to become more human through his Innocence, the revelation that he is the 14th Noah mutes that humanity. According to Anne Lauenroth of Anime News Network, the growing camaraderie between Allen and Tyki during Allen's imprisonment for saving Alma is interesting; it leads to Allen's decision to leave the Order after putting his comrades in danger. Allen's valediction with Lenalee in Hallow has been described as one of the season's best scenes because of the way it was directed, noting Allen's growth and the apparent romantic tone between both characters.

Allen's voice actors have also been reviewed. Animation Insiders Kimberly Morales wrote that Todd Haberkorn, who voiced Allen for the English version of the anime, does a "decent job" matching the original work by Japanese actor Sanae Kobayashi. Michael Marr of Capsule Computers also enjoyed Haberkorn's work and agreed with Morales that it is as appealing as Kobayashi's. Because the series begins in Europe, Casey Brienza criticized Haberkorn for not giving Allen a British accent. Neo found Kobayashi's work more engaging than Haberkorn's.  Lauenroth enjoyed the voice work of Ayumu Murase, who replaced Kobayashi for the second D.Gray-man anime D.Gray-man Hallow. In a later review, Lauenroth praised Murase's work for voicing two characters; Allen and the 14th Noah. Thanasis Karavasilis of Manga Tokyo stated that while many fans of the series were bothered by Murase replacing Kobayashi, he did not mind the change in Allen's voice. Aulakh expressed similar thoughts based on Murase's career, believing the actor would fit the character.

References

D.Gray-man manga volumes by Katsura Hoshino. Original Japanese version published by Shueisha. English translation published by Viz Media.

D.Gray-man characters
Male characters in anime and manga
Adoptee characters in anime and manga
Orphan characters in anime and manga
Anime and manga characters with superhuman strength
Comics characters introduced in 2004
Fictional characters with post-traumatic stress disorder
Fictional clowns
Fictional exorcists
Fictional gamblers
Fictional British people
Fictional musicians
Fictional outlaws
Fictional philanthropists
Fictional swordfighters in anime and manga